Foro is a town in the Northern Red Sea region (Zoba Semienawi Keyih Bahri) of Eritrea.

Overview
A small city located near the coast, Foro was built at the confluence of the Haddas, Aligide and Comaile rivers. In the 1960s, there was significant agricultural development on its alluvial plains.

References

Populated places in Eritrea